The Canadian Premier League Golden Boot has been awarded since the inaugural 2019 season to the Canadian Premier League's leading scorer. The award is given to the player with the most goals in the regular season. Until 2021, the Golden Boot also included goals scored in the CPL playoffs and Finals. The trophy is an Inuit art carving by Pitseolak Qimirpik of Kinngait, Nunavut, depicting an Indigenous hunter.

Winners

References

Golden Boot
Awards established in 2019
2019 establishments in Canada
Canada